Herbert E. Matz, AIA, was a minor American architect practicing in New York City in the mid twentieth century. His best and only known work is Christ Lutheran Church (New York City) (1948). Matz's design for the new church included Gothic Revival details. The congregation sold it in 2007 to a developer who adaptively reused the church as a residence and added a luxury condo tower with six three-bedroom units above the church.

References	

Companies based in Manhattan
American ecclesiastical architects
Architects of Lutheran churches